Pseudocollix kawamurai is a moth in the family Geometridae. It is found in Japan.

The larvae feed on Maesa japonica.

References

Moths described in 1972
Melanthiini
Moths of Japan